Five To One is a 1963 British crime film directed by Gordon Flemyng and starring Lee Montague, Ingrid Hafner and John Thaw. It was made at Merton Park Studios as part of the long-running series of Edgar Wallace adaptations; this being adapted from one of Wallace's short stories.

Plot
Alan Roper, along with his partner-in-crime and his girlfriend, are planning the robbery of a betting shop. Alan asks
crooked bookmaker Larry Hart to launder the money, but little does Larry know, it's his betting shop they plan to steal from.

Cast
Lee Montague as Larry Hart
Ingrid Hafner as Pat Dunn
John Thaw as Alan Roper
Brian McDermott as John Lea
Ewan Roberts as Deighton
Heller Toren as Mai Hart
Jack Watson as Inspector Davis
Richard Clarke as Lucas
Ian Curry as Mycock
Julian Holloway as Sergeant Jenkins
Gordon Rollings as Walker
Edina Ronay as Girl on speedboat
 Clare Kelly as Jean Davis

References

External links
Film page at BFI

1963 films
British crime films
1963 crime films
British black-and-white films
Edgar Wallace Mysteries
Films directed by Gordon Flemyng
1960s English-language films
1960s British films